Bridge and tunnel describes a person who commutes by these modes.

Bridge and Tunnel may also refer to:

Bridge–tunnel, a persistent, unbroken road or rail connection across water
"Bridge and Tunnel" (Agent Carter), an episode of the American television series Agent Carter
Bridge and Tunnel (band), an American punk band
Bridge and Tunnel (film), a 2014 American comedy-drama film
Bridge and Tunnel (play), a 2004 one-woman Broadway show
Bridge and Tunnel (TV series), a 2021 American television series
Bridge and Tunnel Productions, a film company founded by Tina Gharavi